Shiv Charan Singh was an Indian politician. He was a Member of Parliament, representing Rajasthan in the Rajya Sabha the upper house of India's Parliament as a member of the Bharatiya Janata Party.

References

Rajya Sabha members from Rajasthan
Bharatiya Janata Party politicians from Rajasthan
1928 births
Possibly living people